Two Lives may refer to:
Two Lives (non-fiction), a book by Vikram Seth about the romance of his great-uncle and great-aunt.
Two Lives (novel), a pair of novellas by William Trevor sold as a single book.
Two Lives (film), a 2012 German film.
Two Lives (1993), a Russian novel in 4 volumes by Concordia Antarova (1886–1959).

Music
"Two Lives", a song recorded by Petula Clark, written by Gerry Goffin / Tom Kelly / Billy Steinberg and first released on Petula Clark Anthology: Downtown to Sunset Boulevard (2000)
"Two Lives", a single by Bonnie Raitt from Sweet Forgiveness, written by Mark Jordan, also covered by The Carpenters in 1983 on Voice of the Heart
Two Lives (song), a single by Example.